"No More Looking Back" is the penultimate track on The Kinks' 1975 concept album, Schoolboys in Disgrace. Like all of the other tracks on the album, it was written by Ray Davies.

Background

Like the rest of the tracks on Schoolboys in Disgrace, "No More Looking Back" describes the back story of Mr. Flash, the main character from the Preservation saga. In the song, Flash is seen "walking along a crowded street", where he keeps "seeing the things that remind [him] of [his former lover]". He sees her every day, but she's "not really there 'cause [she belongs] to yesterday." Now, for Flash, there is "no more looking back". On Schoolboys in Disgrace, the track is second-to-last, only followed by the 1:04 long track "Finale", which borrows elements from "Education", another track on the album.

The track was released as a maxi-single in Britain (the only single from Schoolboys in Disgrace) with "Jack the Idiot Dunce" and "The Hard Way" (both album tracks from Schoolboys in Disgrace) on the B-side. The track was unsuccessful. However, it has since appeared as the only song from Schoolboys in Disgrace on the compilation album Picture Book.

Reception

"No More Looking Back" has received mixed reviews. Rolling Stone'''s Paul Nelson spoke negatively of the track, saying that "'No More Looking Back' is no 'Waterloo Sunset'". However, Joe Tangari of Pitchfork Media was more approving of the song, saying in his review of the Picture Book'' album that "'No More Looking Back', is a cinematic preview of 90s Britpop, from Dave's harmonized lead guitar intro to Ray's perceptive lyrics about the way people who've left us linger in strange ways."

References

The Kinks songs
1976 singles
Songs written by Ray Davies
Song recordings produced by Ray Davies
1975 songs
RCA Records singles